Francis Luyce (born 13 February 1947) is a French former freestyle swimmer who competed in the 1964 Summer Olympics and in the 1968 Summer Olympics.

See also
World record progression 800 metres freestyle

References

1947 births
Living people
French male freestyle swimmers
Olympic swimmers of France
Swimmers at the 1964 Summer Olympics
Swimmers at the 1968 Summer Olympics
World record setters in swimming
Mediterranean Games gold medalists for France
Swimmers at the 1963 Mediterranean Games
Mediterranean Games medalists in swimming
20th-century French people
21st-century French people
Presidents of the French Swimming Federation